Cassia is a genus of flowering plants in the legume family, Fabaceae, and the subfamily Caesalpinioideae. Species are known commonly as cassias. Cassia is also the English common name of some species in the genus Cinnamomum of the family Lauraceae. Species of the genera Senna and Chamaecrista were previously included in Cassia. Cassia now generally includes the largest species of the legume subtribe Cassiinae, usually mid-sized trees.

Ecology

Cassia species occur in a range of climates. Some can be utilized widely as ornamental plants. They have been used in reforestation projects, and species from desert climates can be used to prevent desertification.

Cassia species are used as food plants by the caterpillars of many lepidopteran taxa. For example, the skipper Astraptes fulgerator and the pierids Catopsilia pomona and C. pyranthe are all seen on Cassia fistula. The latter utilizes several other cassias, as well.

The plant pathogenic viruses cassia yellow blotch bromovirus and cassia yellow spot potyvirus were first described from Cassia.

Uses

Because the name Cassia is not precise, it is sometimes difficult to know what is meant by references to plants known as "cassias". Cassia gum, for example, is made from Senna obtusifolia, a species formerly included in genus Cassia.

Genera Cassia and Senna are both known in systems of traditional medicine. Cassia fistula, for example, is used in Ayurvedic medicine.

There exists some culinary use for cassias. The fruit of some species is edible. In Central America, its pods are stewed into a molasses-like syrup, taken as a sweetener and for its nutritional and medicinal effects. Some have toxins in their seeds, however.

Systematics and taxonomy
There are hundreds of Cassia species, but it is unclear just how many. One estimate stands at 692. The genus was a wastebasket taxon for a long time, used to classify plants that did not fit well anywhere else. Over 1000 species have belonged to Cassia over the years. Many taxa have since been transferred to more appropriate genera, such as Senna.

Species
Cassia comprises the following species:

 Cassia abbreviata Oliv.
 subsp. abbreviata Oliv.
 subsp. beareana (Holmes) Brenan
 subsp. kassneri (Baker f.) Brenan

 Cassia aciphylla A.Gray

 Cassia afrofistula Brenan—Kenyan shower cassia 
 Cassia agnes (de Wit) Brenan

 Cassia aldabrensis Hemsl.
 Cassia angolensis Hiern

 Cassia arereh Delile

 Cassia artensis (Montr.) Beauv.

 Cassia artemisioides DC.
 Cassia aubrevillei Pellegr.

 Cassia bakeriana Craib—pink cassia, wishing-tree
 Cassia barbinervis (Pittier) Pittier
 Cassia barclayana Sweet
 var. barclayana Sweet
 var. pubescens (Benth.) Symon

 Cassia brewsteri (F.Muell.) F.Muell. ex Benth.—Brewster's cassia, cigar cassia
 Cassia burttii Baker f.

 Cassia cardiosperma F.Muell.

 Cassia charlesiana Symon
 Cassia chatelainiana Gaudich.

 Cassia circinnata Benth.
 Cassia cladophylla W.Fitzg.

 Cassia concinna Benth.

 Cassia conspicua (G. Don) Vogel

 Cassia coronilloides Benth.

 Cassia costata J.F.Bailey & C.T.White

 Cassia cowanii H.S.Irwin & Barneby
 var. cowanii H.S.Irwin & Barneby
 var. guianensis (Sandwith) H.S.Irwin & Barneby
 var. peruviana (J.F.Macbr.) H.S.Irwin & Barneb

 Cassia curvistyla J.M.Black
 Cassia cuthbertsonii F.Muell.

 Cassia desolata F.Muell.
 var. desolata F.Muell.
 var. involucrata (J.M. Black) J.M. Black
 var. planipes (J.M. Black) Symon

 Cassia duartei H. S. Irwin

 Cassia eremophila Vogel—desert cassia

 Cassia fastuosa Benth.
 var. calva Irwin & Barneby
 var. fastuosa Benth.

 Cassia ferraria Symon
 Cassia ferruginea (Schrad.) DC.
 var. ferruginea (Schrad.) A. P. de Candolle|DC.
 var. velloziana Irwin & Barneby
 Cassia fistula L.—golden shower, Indian-laburnum, purging cassia

 Cassia floribunda Collad.

 Cassia goniodes Benth.

 Cassia grandis L.f.—pink shower cassia

 Cassia hamersleyensis Symon
 Cassia harneyi Specht

 Cassia helmsii Symon
 Cassia hintonii Sandwith
 Cassia hippophallus Capuron

 Cassia javanica L.—apple-blossom cassia, Palawan cherry
 subsp. bartonii F.M.Bailey
 subsp. javanica L.
 var. javanica L.
 var. microcalyx Irwin & Barneby
 subsp. nodosa (Buch.-Ham. ex Roxb.) K.Larsen & S.S.Larsen
 subsp. pubiflora (Merr.) K.Larsen
 Cassia johannae Vatke

 Cassia lancangensis Y.Y. Qian

 Cassia leiandra Benth.

 Cassia leptoclada Benth.
 Cassia leptophylla Vogel—gold medallion tree

 Cassia leucocephala sensu Bailey

 Cassia luerssenii Domin

 Cassia madagascariensis Bojer
 Cassia magnifolia F.Muell.
 Cassia manicula Symon
 Cassia mannii Oliv.

 Cassia marksiana (Bailey) Domin

 Cassia midas H.S.Irwin & Barneby

 Cassia minutiflora León

 Cassia monserratensis Lundell

 Cassia moschata Kunth
 Cassia mucronulosa (Pittier) J.F. Macbr.

 Cassia nemophila Vogel
 var. coriacea (Benth.) Symon
 var. nemophila Vogel
 var. platypoda (R.Br.) Benth.
 var. zygophylla (Benth.) Benth.

 Cassia neurophylla W.Fitzg.

 Cassia notabilis F.Muell.

 Cassia oligoclada F.Muell.
 var. goniodes (Cunn.) Domin
 var. oligoclada F.Muell.
 Cassia oligophylla F.Muell.
 var. oligophylla F.Muell.
 var. sericea Symon

 Cassia phyllodinea R.Br.

 Cassia pilocarina Symon

 Cassia pinoi (Britton & Rose) Lundell

 Cassia pleurocarpa F.Muell.
 var. angustifolia Symon
 var. longifolia Symon
 var. pleurocarpa F.Muell.

 Cassia polymorpha Harms

 Cassia pruinosa F.Muell.
 Cassia psilocarpa Welw.

 Cassia purpurea Roxb.

 Cassia queenslandica C.T.White

 Cassia regia Standl.

 Cassia renigera Benth.

 Cassia retusa Vogel

 Cassia roxburghii DC.—Roxburgh's cassia
 Cassia rubriflora Ducke
 Cassia rugeoni A. Chev.

 Cassia sieberiana DC.

 Cassia spruceana Benth.

 Cassia stowardii S.Moore

 Cassia stricta (E. Mey.) Steud.
 Cassia sturtii R.Br.

 Cassia succedana Bellardi ex DC.

 Cassia swartzioides Ducke
 var. scarlatina (Ducke) H.S.Irwin & Barneby
 var. swartzioides Ducke

 Cassia thyrsoidea Brenan

 Cassia tomentella (Benth.) Domin

 Cassia trachypus Mart. ex Benth.

 Cassia venusta F.Muell.

Species names with uncertain taxonomic status
The status of the following species is unresolved:

 Cassia acacalis Royle
 Cassia acisperma Schrank ex Colla
 Cassia adenopoda Miq.
 Cassia aegyptiaca Willd.
 Cassia aethiopica Guibourt
 Cassia afzeliana Vogel
 Cassia amara hort. ex Gentil
 Cassia amoena Buch.-Ham.
 Cassia aprica Vell.
 Cassia aristatella (Pennell) Cory
 Cassia arowana M.R.Schomb.
 Cassia artemisiifolia R.Br.
 Cassia artensis Beauvis.
 Cassia atroreticulata Chiov.
 Cassia augustisiliqua Chapm.
 Cassia aurita Collad.
 Cassia barrenfieldii Colla
 Cassia batramensis Steud.
 Cassia bequaerti De Wild.
 Cassia berryana Voigt
 Cassia bifolia Pers. ex Pittier
 Cassia bifora L.
 Cassia bonariensis Colla
 Cassia bonplandia Rojas Acosta
 Cassia brachystachys Harms ex Glaz.
 Cassia bracteosa Lassen
 Cassia bracteosa Welw. ex W.Bull
 Cassia brewsteri (F. Muell.) F. Muell. ex Benth.
 Cassia buchanani Kostel
 Cassia buchananii Kostel.
 Cassia bulbotricha Taub. ex Glaz.
 Cassia burmanni Wall.
 Cassia burmanni Wight
 Cassia burmannii DC.
 Cassia cafesiana Rojas
 Cassia canaliculata R.Br.
 Cassia carringtoniana Torre
 Cassia castiglionia Collad.
 Cassia chinensis Lam.
 Cassia ciliaris Collad.
 Cassia confusa Phil.
 Cassia coymbosa Ortega
 Cassia cruikshanksii Hook. & Arn.
 Cassia cyclophora Boivin ex Ghesq.
 Cassia darmiens Vell.
 Cassia decipiens Desv.
 Cassia decipiens Griseb.
 Cassia delagoensis Harv.
 Cassia deplanchei Benth.
 Cassia disperma Vell.
 Cassia droogmansiana De Wild.
 Cassia eglandulosa Dum.Cours.
 Cassia ehrenbergii Bisch.
 Cassia elongata Lemaire-Lis.
 Cassia fastuosa Willd. ex Vogel
 Cassia fieldii Colla
 Cassia fikifiki Aubrév. & Pellegr.
 Cassia fimbriata Noronha
 Cassia florifera Herrera
 Cassia fluminensis Vell.
 Cassia forsan Harms ex Hoehne
 Cassia forskalii Royle
 Cassia fraseri A.Cunn. ex Vogel
 Cassia gamaensis Glaz.
 Cassia glandulifera Reinw. ex Steud.
 Cassia glanduliflora Reinw. ex Blume
 Cassia gracillima Benth.
 Cassia gracillima Welw.
 Cassia granitica Baker f.
 Cassia graveolens Colla
 Cassia guineensis G.Don
 Cassia gygophylloides Taub.
 Cassia heptanthera F.Muell.
 Cassia heteroloba T.L.Mitch. ex Lindl.
 Cassia heterophylla Walp.
 Cassia hibbertiana Steud.
 Cassia hirta Willd.
 Cassia homophylla Hoffmanns.
 Cassia hornemannii DC.
 Cassia ilidorea Benth.
 Cassia indochinensis (Gagnep.) V.Singh
 Cassia javanica subsp. bartonii (Bailey) K. Larsen
 Cassia kethulleana De Wild.
 Cassia ketschta Hasselq.
 Cassia kituiensis Vatke
 Cassia kuhlmannii Hoehne
 Cassia kuntzei Hosseus
 Cassia kuntzii Hosseus
 Cassia lancifolia Colla
 Cassia laxiflora Benth.
 Cassia lenitiva Bisch.
 Cassia leschenaultii Wall.
 Cassia leucoxylon Klotzsch
 Cassia ligustrinoides Schrank
 Cassia longifolia Steud.
 Cassia lucida Dehnh.
 Cassia mariquitensis Mutis
 Cassia medica Forssk.
 Cassia medica Vell.
 Cassia medicinalis Bisch.
 Cassia milleri Collad.
 Cassia mimosa Noronha
 Cassia modosa Buch.-Ham.
 Cassia mornicola Urb.
 Cassia multisiliqua J.F. Gmel.
 Cassia myriophylla Wall.
 Cassia neocaledonica Vieill. ex Guillaumin
 Cassia nummularia Vahl ex DC.
 Cassia obtusata Hayne
 Cassia oocarpa Baker
 Cassia oppositifolia Glaz.
 Cassia orientalis Pers.
 Cassia ornithopodioides Steud.
 Cassia ovata Mérat & Lens ex Geiger
 Cassia pachycalyx Vogel
 Cassia palmata Wall.
 Cassia pancheri Vieill. ex Guillaumin
 Cassia papulosa Hoffmanns.
 Cassia parviflora Sessé & Moc.
 Cassia parvifolia Wender.
 Cassia pencana Phil.
 Cassia peruviana Vogel
 Cassia pilidens Steud.
 Cassia pinnata Voigt
 Cassia pistaciaefolia Kunth
 Cassia platypoda R.Br.
 Cassia polyadura Fawc. & Rendle
 Cassia porturegalensis Bancr. ex Macfad.
 Cassia pseudo-nictitans Hance
 Cassia pulcherrima Dehnh.
 Cassia purgans Steud.
 Cassia quadriflora Vogel
 Cassia ramiflora Vogel
 Cassia ramosissima Kunth
 Cassia riedelii Benth.
 Cassia robinioides Willd.
 Cassia rogeonii Ghesq.
 Cassia roxburghiana Graham
 Cassia rupicola Benth.
 Cassia rusa M.Martens & Galeotti
 Cassia ruscifolia Jacq.
 Cassia sabak Delile
 Cassia sagera Lam.
 Cassia saltiana Steud.
 Cassia schimperi Steud.
 Cassia schinifolia A.DC.
 Cassia schomburgkii Klotzsch ex Schomburgk
 Cassia schultesii Colla
 Cassia selerocarpa Vogel
 Cassia sieberi C.Presl
 Cassia simplicifolia Desv.
 Cassia sinensis J.F. Gmel.
 Cassia solimoesensis H.S.Irwin
 Cassia sophora Collad.
 Cassia stuhlmannii Taub.
 Cassia surinamensis Dehnh.
 Cassia tarda Noronha
 Cassia taubertiana Harms
 Cassia teretifolia R.Cunn. ex Lindl.
 Cassia teretiuscula F.Muell.
 Cassia tetrafoliata Desv.
 Cassia tettensis Bolle
 Cassia thunbergiana Blume ex Miq.
 Cassia tola L.
 Cassia tortiramis Pittier
 Cassia torulosa Poir.
 Cassia transversali-seminata De Wild.
 Cassia tuberculata Collad.
 Cassia tula Desv. ex Steud.
 Cassia ulei H. Irwin & D. Rogers
 Cassia umbellata Bertol.
 Cassia umbellata Rchb.
 Cassia unica Schery
 Cassia ursinoides Harms ex Luetzelb.
 Cassia vernicifolia Taub.
 Cassia viciaefolia Benth.
 Cassia vulgaris Roxb. ex Steud.
 Cassia xanthocoma Miq.

Hybrids
The following hybrids have been described:

 Cassia ×corymbosa Larrañaga
 Cassia ×desolata F.Muell.
 Cassia ×floribunda Cav.
 Cassia ×homophylla Hoffmanns.
 Cassia ×hybrida Ten.
 Cassia ×lancasteri 
 Cassia ×luerssenii Domin
 Cassia ×nealiae H.S.Irwin & Barneby—rainbow shower tree (=Cassia fistula L. × Cassia javanica L.)

 Cassia ×regia Standl.
 Cassia ×sturtii R.Br.

See also
 Sydney Percy-Lancaster

References

 

 
Fabaceae genera
Cassieae